Yuri, also known as Broadcasting Satellite or BS, was a series of Japanese direct broadcast satellites.

The first satellite of this series, called BSE or Yuri 1, was launched in 1978. The last BS series satellite, BS-3b (Yuri 3b), was launched in 1991.

Early models
The 350 kg BSE was followed in 1984 and 1986 by the operational and essentially identical BS-2a and BS-2b satellites, respectively. Each spacecraft carried two active and one spare 100 W. 14/12 GHz transponder. Built by EURO with  assistance from ASR, the BS-2 series satellites were designed for five years of operation. BS-2a was moved to a graveyard orbit in 1989, as was BS-2b in 1992.

BS satellites
BS satellites were used for Direct-To-Home television services in Japan. Japanese satellite television, which uses an analog format, started with test broadcasts carried out by the semigovernmental NHK (Japan Broadcasting Corporation) in 1984. At the time, direct satellite TV reception (DTH) was obtainable with a small parabolic antenna 40 cm to 60 cm in diameter in all areas of Japan when broadcast from a geostationary earth orbit (GEO) at 110 degrees east longitude. All BS satellites were of the same basic configuration: 3-axis stabilization of a rectangular satellite bus with two elongated solar arrays. 
After the first successful test of satellite broadcasting with a TV signal, many Japanese producers of consumer electronics began to deliver a range of equipment with built-in satellite receivers for the local consumer market. This included the Satellaview satellite modem peripheral for Nintendo's Super Famicom system, as well as satellite television and satellite radio services for the Japanese market.

Eventually, the satellites of the BS series were replaced by the more advanced B-Sat series.

Satellites

References

External links

 BS-Japan and Satellite Communication Services
 Broadcasting Technology and Time
 Broadcasting Satellite 2
 Broadcasting Satellite 3

Satellites of Japan
Direct broadcast satellite services